Savvas Exouzidis (born 4 December 1981) is a Greek football manager and former footballer, who currently is the manager of FC Winterthur U21.

Career

Exouzidis among various clubs, previously played for RKC Waalwijk in the Eredivisie and Panionios F.C. and Iraklis Thessaloniki F.C. in the Greek Super League.

References

External links
 
Myplayer.gr Profile
Profile at the Football League's website

Living people
1981 births
Greek footballers
Greek expatriate footballers
German people of Greek descent
Greek expatriates in Cyprus
Greek expatriate sportspeople in Switzerland
Expatriate footballers in the Netherlands
Expatriate footballers in Cyprus
Expatriate footballers in Switzerland
SpVgg Ludwigsburg players
Aris Limassol FC players
Panionios F.C. players
RKC Waalwijk players
Iraklis Thessaloniki F.C. players
Pierikos F.C. players
Diagoras F.C. players
FC Winterthur players
FC Frauenfeld players
Eerste Divisie players
Super League Greece players
Cypriot First Division players
Swiss Challenge League players
Association football defenders
FC Frauenfeld managers
Greek football managers
Footballers from Stuttgart